The Christmas Bird Count (CBC) is a census of birds in the Western Hemisphere, performed annually in the early Northern-hemisphere winter by volunteer birdwatchers and administered by the National Audubon Society.  The purpose is to provide population data for use in science, especially conservation biology, though many people participate for recreation.  The CBC is the longest-running citizen science survey in the world.

History

Up through the 19th century, many North Americans participated in the tradition of Christmas "side hunts", in which they competed at how many birds they could kill, regardless of whether they had any use for the carcasses and of whether the birds were beneficial, beautiful, or rare.  In December 1900, the U.S. ornithologist Frank Chapman, founder of Bird-Lore (which became Audubon magazine), proposed counting birds on Christmas instead of killing them.  

On Christmas Day of that year, 27 observers took part in the first count in 25 places in the United States and Canada, the count totaling 18,500 individual birds belonging to 90 species.  Since then the counts have been held every winter, usually with increasing numbers of observers.  For instance, the 101st count, in the winter of 2000–2001, involved 52,471 people in 1,823 places in 17 countries (but mostly in the U.S. and Canada).  During the 113th count (winter 2012–2013), 71,531 people participated in 2,369 locations. The National Audubon Society now partners with Bird Studies Canada, the Gulf Coast Bird Observatory of Texas (responsible for CBCs in Mexico), and the Red Nacional de Observadores de Aves (RNOA, National Network of Bird Observers) and the Instituto Alexander von Humboldt of Colombia.

The greatest number of bird species ever reported by any U.S. location in a single count is 250, observed on December 19, 2005 in the Matagorda County-Mad Island Marsh count circle around  Matagorda and Palacios, Texas. The greatest number of bird species ever reported by a CBC circle in the world is 531, observed on December 21, 2013 in the Cosanga-Narupa count (previously known as the Yanayacu count) on the eastern slope of the Andes in Ecuador.

Methods
Participation in the Count is open to all, and as of 2012 participation was free of charge.

Each individual count is performed in a "count circle" with a diameter of 15 miles (24.14 kilometres).  At least ten volunteers, including a compiler to manage things, count in each circle. They break up into small parties and follow assigned routes, which change little from year to year, counting every bird they see.  In most count circles, some people also watch feeders instead of following routes.

Counts can be held on any day from December 14 to January 5 inclusive.

The results are by no means as accurate as a human census. The experience of the observing birders influences both species identification and quality of locations examined. Not all the area in the count circles is covered, and not every bird along the routes is seen or identified. Big flocks can't be counted precisely. Also, telling whether a bird has been counted twice can be difficult. The rules address this problem by prohibiting counting birds when retracing one's route, except for species that the party hasn't seen before. Also, when a large roost of some species occurs in a count circle, an expert estimates the number for that species during the morning or evening and usually no individuals are counted at other times. Observers can attempt to keep track of flocks of mobile birds such as crows, and can use their judgement, even sometimes recognizing an individual bird or at least that two birds of the same species are different individuals.

The results, providing data on winter ranges of birds, are complementary to those of the Breeding Bird Surveys.

See also
Australian Bird Count (ABC)
BioBlitz ("24-hour inventory")
Breeding Bird Survey
Great Backyard Bird Count
Tucson Bird Count (TBC) (in Arizona in the US)
Citizen science

References

Further reading 

  Page 9 content located at https://www.newspapers.com/clip/23180435/christmas_bird_count_more_than_game_pt2/ .

External links
Audubon Official CBC page
Bird Studies Canada Official CBC page
RNOA Official CBC page (in Spanish)

Bird censuses
Ornithological citizen science